Peter Fisher may refer to:
 Peter Fisher (photojournalist) (1929–2013), Hungarian-born cinematographer and photojournalist
 Peter Fisher (actor) (born 1954), Australian film and television actor
 Peter Fisher (politician) (born 1936), member of the Australian House of Representatives
 Peter Fisher (1930s footballer), Scottish professional association footballer
 Peter Fisher (footballer, born 1920) (1920–2010), Scottish footballer
 Peter Fisher (activist) (1944–2012), American author and gay rights activist
 Peter Fisher (historian) (1782–1848), Canadian historian
 Peter Fisher (musician) ([fl. 1990–now), of the British band Sphere3 and Irish band Glyde
 Peter Fisher (physician) (1950–2018), British physician
 Peter Fisher (translator) (born 1934), British academic, known for translating Gesta Danorum
 Peter R. Fisher (born 1956), U.S. Under Secretary of the Treasury
 Peter H. Fisher, physicist

See also
Peter Fischer (disambiguation)